The NWA Austra-Asian Heavyweight Championship was the top singles professional wrestling title in the Australian World Championship Wrestling promotion from 1972 until the promotion's 1978 closure.

WCW had joined the National Wrestling Alliance in August 1969, still recognizing its IWA World Heavyweight Championship title as its world title. In 1971, that title was abandoned in favor of this one. The NWA World Heavyweight Championship was then recognized in WCW as the world title.

11 different men held the championship, combining for 15 individual title reigns.

Title history

See also
Professional wrestling in Australia
World Championship Wrestling

Footnotes

References

External links

National Wrestling Alliance championships
World Championship Wrestling (Australia) championships
Heavyweight wrestling championships
Professional wrestling in Australia
Intercontinental professional wrestling championships